General Godwin was an Australian convict transport ship. General Godwin may also refer to:

Abraham Godwin (1763–1835), U.S. Army brigadier general
Archibald C. Godwin (1831–1864), Confederate States Army brigadier general
Charles Godwin (1873–1951), British Indian Army lieutenant general
Henry Godwin (Army officer) (1784–1853), British Army major general

See also
Alfred Reade Godwin-Austen (1889–1963), British Army general
Godwin Abbe (born 1949), Nigerian Army major general